Hokmabad (also Romanized as Ḩokmābād and Hukmābād) is a village in Hokmabad Rural District, Atamalek District, Jowayin County, Razavi Khorasan Province, Iran. At the 2006 census, its population was 3,419, in 919 families.

References 

Populated places in Joveyn County